Anabrus is a genus of insects in the family Tettigoniidae that includes the Mormon cricket.

The Orthoptera Species File, lists the following species:
 †Anabrus caudelli Cockerell, 1908
 Anabrus cerciata Caudell, 1907
 Anabrus longipes Caudell, 1907
 Anabrus simplex Haldeman, 1852

References

External links
 
 

Tettigoniidae
Tettigoniidae genera
Taxa named by Samuel Stehman Haldeman